Watertown High School (WHS) is the local high school, built in 1925, for Watertown, Massachusetts, United States. The school is home to the Watertown Raiders, who are best known for their varsity field hockey and boys' basketball programs. Watertown's colors are black and red. The school newspaper is the Raider Times.  On May 8, 1930, ex-President Calvin Coolidge was received at the school as town celebrated its 300th anniversary.  As a part of the celebration, a national radio program was broadcast from the high school marking the momentous anniversary.

Sports 
Watertown High has brought home several sports championships, as well as the state championships of 2007, 2009 and 2018 for boys' basketball. Watertown has had many state, Middlesex, and Division II championships from girls field hockey. Girls field hockey won the state tournament against Oakmont Regional High School in 2009; the final score was 1–0. They also beat Auburn in 2010 (1-0) and Oakmont again in 2011 (3-2). Watertown boys' hockey won the Division III State Championship in 2015. On October 21, 2015, the girls' field hockey team set a new high school national record by winning their 154th consecutive game.

Notable alumni 

 Eliza Dushku, actress and model
 Hrach Gregorian, political consultant, educator, and writer
 Mark Roopenian, NFL player
 George Yankowski, former Major League Baseball player for Philadelphia Athletics and Chicago White Sox

References

Buildings and structures in Watertown, Massachusetts
Schools in Middlesex County, Massachusetts
Public high schools in Massachusetts